Curlew Island is a small island in the southern Gulf Islands, located in the Strait of Georgia between Mayne Island and Samuel Island in British Columbia, Canada. It was presumably named after the British sloop HMS Curlew.

See also
List of islands of British Columbia

References

Capital Regional District
Islands of the Gulf Islands